Wings of Power WWII Heavy Bombers and Jets is a video game of the flight simulation genre released in 2004 as an add on to enhance Microsoft Flight Simulator 2004.Wings of Power adds vintage historical military aircraft to Microsoft Flight Simulator 2004.Wings of Power also adds 50 missions with some historical missions from real military pilot logs from World War II and adds new special effects to Microsoft's flight simulator series.

The aircraft in Wings of Power: WWII Heavy Bombers and Jets include the B-17 Flying Fortress models F and G, B-29 model a Superfortress, Arado 234B Blitz, He-162 Salamander, Focke-Wulf Ta-183 Huckebein, Avro Lancaster Mk III heavy bomber, B-24 models D and J Liberator and PB4Y-2 Privateer.

This simulator add on is strictly with Pilot or Copilot controls only.
So there is no combat in this add on unlike Shockwave's earlier Firepower add on.
However the developers added some sophisticated controls and actual pilots procedures used to start and fly these aircraft in the simulation. So they simulate how the aircraft is actually flown to a very good degree. The simulation add on comes with a good size 158 page manual detailing the controls and operable 2D panels which can be brought up on the computers screen to manually operate different control panel boxes used in the actual aircraft.
However, not all the actual pilot and copilot controls of the real military aircraft
are here in the simulation most notably the B-17's induction system. Unfortunately this is due to a limitation of Microsoft's Flight Simulator 2004. Even so, this add on would be useful for learning some of the operation and procedures of the actual World War II military aircraft. The simulation is designed so that the aircraft operate and fly to pretty decent flight dynamics as the real aircraft.
So it can be a challenge to land a heavy World War II bomber in the simulation without crashing and there can be random failures of aircraft systems so a simulation pilot can learn what to do in certain circumstances. Shockwave Productions recommends that individuals who have purchased this obtain a copy of the pilots manual (flight manuals are just one source in the external links) for the aircraft they choose to fly in this add on. It is easy to see why because real World War II military bomber pilots with their copilots went through checklists before takeoff with flight engineers reading off the instruments and had years of very extensive training. However, if the simulation player so chooses he doesn't have to go through these complicated procedures and controls featured. Instead the full realism can be turned off in Microsoft's flight simulator's menu. Then again the player will be missing out on a great learning experience.

Various 3rd party sites carry numerous repaints of these bombers with different paint schemes and nose art for free download created by fans of the simulation add on.
An individual using this simulation would greatly benefit by obtaining a device known as Track IR. See Battle of Britain II: Wings of Victory for the external links and video demonstration. Note the video demonstration is highly compressed as the simulation was actually on a 1080i high definition monitor. The gallery screenshots below are compressed too and the actual in game graphics are a lot better (you can check the Goldenwings external links to see decent screenshots of FS2004 plus it is a good free add on).

See also
Aircraft Powerpack
B-17 Flying Fortress (computer game)
Firepower (computer game)
History of Microsoft Flight Simulator
Microsoft Flight Simulator
Microsoft Flight Simulator X
Wings of Power II: WWII Fighters

External links
Shockwave Productions,Inc. website
Shockwave Forum and update patches
New Shockwave Productions WOP II B-17 for Microsoft FSX introduced March 26 2007
Eflightmanuals.org
Avsim Online under file library
Sim-Outhouse under add ons
Netwings file library
FSwarbirds.com
Flightsim.com
Goldenwings
Microsoft Games for Windows

External links related subjects
Zeno's Warbird Videos
International Historic Films
The Collings foundation
Arizona Wing CAF
Experimental Aircraft Association's B-17
The Bomber Restaurant
The United States Army Air Forces in World War II
Official website of the United States Air Force

2004 video games
Video games developed in the United States
World War II flight simulation video games
Windows games
Windows-only games